Beyond the Border is a 1925 American silent Western film directed by Scott R. Dunlap, produced by Hunt Stromberg and starring Harry Carey. It was released by Producers Distributing Corporation.

Plot
As described in a film magazine review, while Sheriff Bob Smith is away from town going after the bandit Bob Moore, the villain has a new sheriff elected in his place. Captured, tried, and convicted, Moore confesses that he is also known as "Bob Smith" and that his sister, whom he has not seen in childhood, is coming to town.  Moore proposes that Smith pose as him so that his long-lost sister will not know that her brother is actually an outlaw. Smith agrees, and upon meeting her falls in love with her. He rounds up the villain's gang, gets his sheriff's job back, and wins the young woman after saving her real brother.

Cast
 Harry Carey as Bob Smith
 William Scott as Bob Moore
 Mildred Harris as Molly Smith
 Tom Santschi as Nick Perdue
 Jack Richardson as Brick Dawson
 Joe Rickson as Deputy (credited as Joseph Rickson)
 Neola May as Housekeeper (credited as Princess Neola)
 Victor Potel as Man with smallpox (credited as Vic Potel)

See also
 List of American films of 1925
 Harry Carey filmography

References

External links
 
 

1925 films
American black-and-white films
1925 Western (genre) films
Films directed by Scott R. Dunlap
Producers Distributing Corporation films
Silent American Western (genre) films
1920s American films
1920s English-language films